Faith Global was a synthpop and new wave band composed of Stevie Shears (guitar, bass, synthesizer, piano), original Ultravox! guitarist and Jason Guy (vocals, acoustic guitar).

Stevie Shears had been in Ultravox! and Cowboys International, when suddenly Faith Global was formed in the early 1980s.

Shears met Guy after leaving Ultravox in 1978 and decided to form a band; Ice, bassist with Gloria Mundi, Shears and Guy formed New Men. The band didn't last long, so Shears went to Cowboys International and Guy formed another band, but continued to maintain contacts. Later Survival Records (label founded by the duo Drinking Electricity) offered them money to work in the studio.

In Survival, recorded and released an EP called Earth Report in 1982 and the album The Same Mistakes in 1983. Shortly afterwards, it seems Faith Global split up. Shears continues playing guitar, but retired from the music business, while the whereabouts of Guy are unknown.

Discography
 Earth Report EP (1982)
 The Same Mistakes album (1983)

External links
  Faith Global press interviews and photos 

English new wave musical groups